Kheyrabad-e Hajji Ahmad (also Romanized as Kheyrābād-e Ḩājjī Aḩmad) is a village in Rizab Rural District, Qatruyeh District, Neyriz County, Fars Province, Iran. At the 2006 census, its population was 17, in 4 families.

References 

Populated places in Neyriz County